This is the list of notable stars in the constellation Scorpius, sorted by decreasing brightness.

See also
Lists of stars by constellation

References

List
Scorpius